Pénzügyőr Sportegyesület is a professional football club based in Pasarét, Budapest, Hungary, that competes in the Nemzeti Bajnokság III, the third tier of Hungarian football.

Honours

Domestic
Nemzeti Bajnokság III:
Winner (1): 1970–71, 1991–92

External links
 Profile on Magyar Futball

References

Football clubs in Hungary
Association football clubs established in 1950
1950 establishments in Hungary